Orianica Velasquez Herrera (born 1 August 1989) is a Colombian footballer who plays as a left back for Atlético Junior and the Colombia women's national team.

Club career
In October 2016, Velasquez moved to Turkey, and joined 1207 Antalya Dçşemealtı Belediye Spor along with her compatriots Lady Andrade and Carolina Arias to play in the 2016–17 Turkish Women's First Football League.

International career
Velasquez made her international debut for Colombia on 12 November 2006 against Uruguay. She represented the country at both the 2012 and 2016 Summer Olympics, and the 2011 and 2015 Women's World Cups.

Career statistics
.

References

External links 
 

1989 births
Living people
People from La Guajira Department
Colombian women's footballers
Women's association football fullbacks
Indiana Hoosiers women's soccer players
Zaragoza CFF players
1207 Antalya Spor players
Primera División (women) players
Colombia women's international footballers
2011 FIFA Women's World Cup players
2015 FIFA Women's World Cup players
Olympic footballers of Colombia
Footballers at the 2012 Summer Olympics
Footballers at the 2016 Summer Olympics
Footballers at the 2015 Pan American Games
Medalists at the 2015 Pan American Games
Pan American Games gold medalists for Colombia
Pan American Games medalists in football
Footballers at the 2019 Pan American Games
Medalists at the 2019 Pan American Games
Colombian expatriate women's footballers
Colombian expatriate sportspeople in the United States
Expatriate women's soccer players in the United States
Colombian expatriate sportspeople in Spain
Expatriate women's footballers in Spain
Colombian expatriate sportspeople in Turkey
Expatriate women's footballers in Turkey